Vexillum gorii is a species of small sea snail, marine gastropod mollusk in the family Costellariidae, the ribbed miters.

Description
Vexillum gorii are about one inch long. They are white to light brown in color.

Distribution

References

gorii
Gastropods described in 1997